Kunwar Mohan Swarup (18 February 1918 -  15 June 1978 ) was Member of Parliament in the second (1957), third (1962), and fourth (1967) Lok Sabha on Praja Socialist Party's ticket and again in fifth Lok Sabha (1971–77) as a member of Congress Party from Pilibhit Constituency. In 1977, he contested the seat again on Indian National Congress's ticket but lost to Janata Party in the anti-Indira wave. Swarup was son of Kunwar Shambhu Sahai, a prominent freedom fighter and social worker from Sahora village.

Early life and education
Mohan Swarup was educated at Bareilly College, in Bareilly and married Shanti Devi in May 1940 at the age of 22. The couple had four sons and two daughters.

Career
Swarup was associated with the Praja Socialist Party (PSP) until 1970. He held various posts and committee memberships.

Positions held
 District Board, Bareilly
 Zila Parishad, Bareilly
 District Bhoodan Samiti, Bareilly
 Managing Committee, Kr. Dhakan Lal Vidya Mandir College, Sahora, Bareilly
 Bharat Sewak Samaj, Bareilly
 National Railway Users' Consultative Committee
 Goodwill Mission to Ghana, Liberia, Sierra Leone and Nigeria
 Pradhan, Gram Sabha, Sahora, Bareilly
 Sarpanch, Nyaya Panchayat, Sahora, Bareilly
 District Secretary, P.S.P., Bareilly
 President, P. & T. Employees Union, Pilibhit
 Secretary, All India Caterers' Union
 Public Accounts Committee
 Estimates Committee
 Consultative Committee for Works and Housing

He was elected as the second Member of Parliament from Pilibhit Constituency with 50.54% votes as a PSP member, defeating a rival from the Indian National Congress (INC) who got 34.86% of the vote in the 1957 general election.

He was elected again from the constituency with 29.62% of the vote, defeated the INC contender's 27.42% in the 1962 general election.

He was re-elected in the 1967 general election with 28.24% vote, still as a PSP representative from Pilibhit, defeated his rival from the INC, who got 24.26% votes.

In the 1972 general election, he contested as an INC candidate in Pilibhit and won the seat with 38.96% votes and defeated his nearest contestant who was from Indian National Congress and received only 29.37% votes.

Personal life
Swarup travelled widely around the world to learn new ideas. He was also interested in shooting, swimming, horse-riding, painting, writing and photography.

References

1918 births
People from Pilibhit
1978 deaths
India MPs 1957–1962
India MPs 1962–1967
India MPs 1967–1970
India MPs 1971–1977
Praja Socialist Party politicians
Lok Sabha members from Uttar Pradesh
People from Bareilly district
Uttar Pradesh district councillors